The Nordic Journal of Botany is a monthly peer-reviewed scientific journal of botany, including the plant ecology, taxonomy, evolution, conservation, and biogeography of plants, algae, bryophytes, and fungi. It originated from four botanical journals, Botanisk Tidsskrift, Friesia, Norwegian Journal of Botany, and Botaniska Notiser, that merged together as one. Currently, the journal is published by Wiley-Blackwell on behalf of the Nordic Society Oikos (NSO) in collaboration with Oikos (journal), Journal of Avian Biology, Wildlife Biology, Lindbergia and Ecography.

The editor-in-chiefs are Torbjörn Tyler (Lund University) and Sara Cousins (Stockholm University). According to the Journal Citation Reports, the journal has a 2021 impact factor of 0.931, ranking it  200th out of 240 journals in the category "Plant Sciences".

See also 
 List of botany journals

References

External links 
 Official website Wiley
 Official website NSO 

Wiley-Blackwell academic journals
Bimonthly journals
English-language journals
Publications established in 1981
Botany journals